Quote ... Unquote is a panel game which was broadcast on BBC Radio 4 and based on quotations. Since the series began on 4 January 1976, every episode was chaired by its deviser, Nigel Rees. The programme is available online via the BBC Sounds application. Its final series, the 57th, aired in November/December 2021.

Format
The main part of the programme consists of a non-competitive quiz where the chairman asks each of three panellists (originally four) in turn to identify where a certain quotation, phrase or saying comes from. In between these rounds, the panellists are asked to share some of their favourite quotations on a specified theme. Other parts of the programme are devoted to answering queries from listeners about the sources of quotations and the origins of everyday phrases and idioms.

Panellists
There have been over 500 guests on the programme, many appearing several times. They include: Tom Stoppard, Peter Cook, Peter Ustinov, Ned Sherrin, Judi Dench, Alan Bennett, Denis Healey, David Attenborough, Kingsley Amis, Kenneth Williams, Douglas Adams, John Mortimer, Neil Kinnock, Celia Haddon, Katharine Whitehorn, Julian Mitchell, Malcolm Muggeridge and Lord George-Brown.

Production
The programme uses former BBC staff announcers or actors to read the quotations. Ronald Fletcher was the original reader. In later years the main male reader was Peter Jefferson, formerly of Radio 4, who took over from William Franklyn when the actor died in 2006. Another former Radio 4 announcer, Charlotte Green, assumed the role from the beginning of Series 50 in August 2014. Patricia Hughes, formerly in the same role on Radio 3, was another regular from 1994.

Several significant comedy producers have supervised the programme early in their careers, including John Lloyd (deviser of QI), TV executive Geoffrey Perkins, Have I Got News for You producer Harry Thompson and Armando Iannucci.

The programme's theme tune, between which snatches of quotations are inserted at the beginning of each show, is "Duddly Dell", written and performed by Dudley Moore — the B-side of the single "Strictly for the Birds" (1961).

Following the 500th edition, broadcast in December 2021, Nigel Rees announced that he was ending the programme after 46 years, partly because the pandemic made it impossible to record in the traditional way with a studio audience and also because of the BBC's insistence on "woke" attitudes. Rees has said the associated newsletter would continue.

References

External links
 

BBC Radio 4 programmes
BBC Radio comedy programmes
British panel games
British radio game shows
1970s British game shows
1980s British game shows
1990s British game shows
2000s British game shows
2010s British game shows
2020s British game shows